The 2022–23 season is the 34th season in the history of UD Almería and their first season back in the top flight since 2015. The club are participating in La Liga and the Copa del Rey.

Players 
.

Reserve team

Out on loan

Transfers

In

Out

Pre-season and friendlies

Competitions

Overall record

La Liga

League table

Results summary

Results by round

Matches 
The league fixtures were announced on 23 June 2022.

Copa del Rey

References

UD Almería seasons
Almería